W16DQ-D, virtual channel 43 (UHF digital channel 16), is a low-power HSN-affiliated television station licensed to Lealman, Florida, United States. The station is owned by HC2 Holdings.

From June 2007 to May 2008, this station affiliated with LAT TV, a Spanish-language network. Since that network folded and until its affiliation with SBN, it is unknown what programming that station offered.

Analog-to-digital conversion 
The station converted to digital in October 2011, flash cutting on channel 43. In 2017, the station moved to channel 16, using the frequency vacated by WUSF-TV in 2009; the station's call letters changed from W43CE-D to W16DQ-D. Through the use of PSIP, the station's virtual channel remains 43.

In June 2013, W43CE-D was slated to be sold to Landover 5 LLC as part of a larger deal involving 51 other low-power television stations; the sale fell through in June 2016. Mako Communications sold its stations, including W43CE-D, to HC2 Holdings in 2017.

References

External links

16DQ-D
Television channels and stations established in 1983
Low-power television stations in the United States
1983 establishments in Florida
Mass media in St. Petersburg, Florida
Classic Reruns TV affiliates